The 14th Pennsylvania House of Representatives District is located in western Pennsylvania and has been represented by Jim E. Marshall since 2007.

District profile
The 14th Pennsylvania House of Representatives District is located in Beaver County and includes the following areas:

Beaver Falls
 Big Beaver
 Bridgewater
 Chippewa Township
 Darlington
 Darlington Township
 Daugherty Township
Eastvale
Economy
Ellwood City (Beaver County Portion)
 Fallston
Franklin Township
 Homewood
Koppel
 Marion Township
New Brighton
 New Galilee
 New Sewickley Township
 Patterson Heights
 Patterson Township
 Pulaski Township
 West Mayfield
 White Township

Representatives

Recent election results

References

External links
District map from the United States Census Bureau
Pennsylvania House Legislative District Maps from the Pennsylvania Redistricting Commission.  
Population Data for District 14 from the Pennsylvania Redistricting Commission.

Government of Beaver County, Pennsylvania
Government of Butler County, Pennsylvania
14